Drepanophorus is a genus of worms belonging to the family Drepanophoridae.

The genus has almost cosmopolitan distribution.

Species:

Drepanophorus cerinus
Drepanophorus crassus 
Drepanophorus edwardsi 
Drepanophorus gravieri 
Drepanophorus massiliensis 
Drepanophorus modestus 
Drepanophorus ritteri 
Drepanophorus rubrostriatus 
Drepanophorus serraticollis

References

Nemerteans